Mini Siam is a famous miniature park attraction in Pattaya, Chonburi, Thailand. This park is located 143 km from Bangkok on Sukhumvit Road.

Mini Siam had been started to research the project in 1985, and had been constructed in 1986 with more 29 Rais which separated to be Mini Siam, and Mini Europe. For the rest area, there are the booking halls, the souvenir shops for lease and the parking lLots. The Democracy Monument in Bangkok was the first model to be built.

Mini Siam Pattaya will close in 2023 due to a new electical parade which permire in 2024, it feature several famous landmark including Langham Place and Taipei 101, and the music is same as Disney Paint the Night Parade

Mini Siam Zone replicas 

 Wat Phra Kaeo
 Phanom Rung historical park
 Wat Arun 
 Phra Thinang Aisawan Thiphyaart
 Ananta Samakhom Throne Hall
 Wat Mahathat, from Sukhothai Historical Park
 Ayutthaya Historical Park
 Wat Phra Si Sanphet
 Victory Monument
 Rama IX Bridge

Mini Europe Zone replicas 
 Arc de Triomphe
 Eiffel Tower
 Leaning Tower of Pisa
 Coliseum
 Abu Simbel
 Tower Bridge
 Sydney Opera House
 Statue of Liberty
 Angkor Wat
 Temple of Heaven

References 

Amusement parks in Thailand
Buildings and structures in Pattaya
Buildings and structures completed in 1986
1986 establishments in Thailand